3-Nitrobenzanthrone (3-nitro-7H-benz[de]anthracen-7-one) is a chemical compound emitted in diesel exhaust; it is a potent carcinogen. It produced the highest score ever reported in the Ames test, a standard measure of the cancer-causing potential of toxic chemicals, far greater than the previous known strongest (1,8-dinitropyrene, which is also found in diesel exhaust).

See also
 Benzanthrone

References

Carcinogens
Nitro compounds
Ketones
Polycyclic aromatic compounds
IARC Group 2B carcinogens